Andy LaVerne (born December 4, 1947) is an American jazz pianist, composer, arranger, and educator.

Education and musical career
Born in New York City, LaVerne studied at Juilliard School of Music, Berklee College, and the New England Conservatory, and took private lessons from jazz pianist Bill Evans. LaVerne has worked with Frank Sinatra, Stan Getz, Woody Herman, Dizzy Gillespie, Chick Corea, Lionel Hampton, Michael Brecker and Elvin Jones.

A prolific recording artist, his projects as a leader number more than 50,  including Intuition, a duo with saxophonist Jerry Bergonzi (SteepleChase), and Epiphany (ClaveBop).

Instruction
LaVerne is a prominent jazz educator, having released a series of instructional videos, Guide to Modern Jazz Piano, Vols. 1 &, 2, and Jazz Piano Standards (Homespun Tapes), featuring the Yamaha Disklavier, as well as the video, In Concert (Homespun Tapes), with guitarist John Abercrombie.

He is the author of Handbook of Chord Substitutions, Tons of Runs (Ekay), Bill Evans Compositions 19 Solo Piano Arrangements, and is the pianist on The Chick Corea Play-Along Collection (Hal Leonard). The Music of Andy LaVerne (SteepleChase Publications) has been published.  Countdown to Giant Steps (Aebersold Jazz) is a two-CD play-along companion book, of which LaVerne served as player/producer/writer, and Tunes You Thought You Knew (Aebersold Jazz) is a LaVerne play-along CD/book set. Secret of the Andes is collection of LaVerne originals published by Aebersold Jazz.

He is a frequent contributor (since 1986) to Keyboard magazine, and Piano Today magazine. His articles have also appeared in Down Beat, Jazz Improv, Piano Quarterly, Jazz and Keyboard Workshop, and JazzOne.

He is the recipient of five Jazz Fellowships from the National Endowment for the Arts and winner of the 2000 John Lennon Songwriting Contest for his tune "Shania". He has appeared at concerts, festivals, and clubs throughout the world, and has given clinics and master classes at universities, colleges, and conservatories worldwide. He has also toured and recorded with singer-songwriter Neil Sedaka. He is Professor of Jazz Piano at The Hartt School (University of Hartford), and on the faculty of the Aebersold Summer Jazz Workshops.

Discography

As leader

As sideman
With Ted Curson
 Jubilant Power (Inner City, 1976)

With Stan Getz
 Another World (Columbia, 1977)
 Mort d'un Pourri (Melba, 1977) 
 Children of the World (Columbia, 1979)

References

External links
 [ Allmusic]
 Official website
 "In Conversation with Andy LaVerne" by Eugene Marlow, (Jazz.com)
 

American jazz pianists
American male pianists
Living people
1947 births
SteepleChase Records artists
University of Hartford Hartt School faculty
20th-century American pianists
21st-century American pianists
20th-century American male musicians
21st-century American male musicians
American male jazz musicians
Double-Time Records artists